A gambang, properly called a gambang kayu ('wooden gambang') is a xylophone-like instrument used among people of Indonesia in gamelan and kulintang, with wooden bars as opposed to the metallic ones of the more typical metallophones in a gamelan. A largely obsolete instrument, the gambang gangsa, is a similar instrument made with metal bars.

Gambang kayu
The bars of the instrument are made of a se wood, generally teak. It also found in ironwood (kayu besi). The bars mounted in a deep wooden case that serves as a resonator. Instruments typically have 17-21 keys that are easily removed, and are kept in place by having a hole through which a nail is placed. Generally a full gamelan has two sets, one gambang pelog and the other one gambang slendro.

A pair of long thin mallets (tabuh), made of flexible water buffalo horn tipped with felt, are used to play the instrument. Gambangs are generally played in parallel octaves (gembyang). Occasionally, other styles of playing are employed such as playing kempyung which are playing two notes separated by two keys. Unlike most other gamelan instruments, no dampening is required, as the wood does not ring like the metal keys of other instruments.

The gambang is used in a number of gamelan ensembles. It is most notable in the Balinese gamelan Gambang. In Javanese wayang, it is used by itself to accompany the dalang in certain chants. Within a full gamelan, it stands out somewhat because of the high speed of playing, and contrasting timbre because of its materials and more because it has a wider melodic range than the other instruments.

In Javanese gamelan, the gambang plays cengkok like the other elaborating instruments. However, the repertoire of cengkok for the gambang is more rudimentary than for other instruments (for instance, the gendér), and a great deal of variation is accepted.

Gambang gangsa
The gambang gangsa has a similar construction, although it generally has fewer keys (typically 15) and is thus somewhat smaller. It has largely been replaced by the saron family of instruments. It was formerly thought to have been a forerunner of the one-octave saron, although more recent evidence, including the appearance of the saron in reliefs at Borobudur in the 9th century, indicate that the instruments are of the same age or that the one-octave saron is older.

In early 19th century writings on the Javanese gamelan, it seems to have been played like the gambang kayu; that is, as an elaborating instrument. Later, by 1890, it seems to have merely substituted for a saron, and have been restricted to a small range. Mantle Hood associated this use of limited range to a preference for certain octave arrangements of the cadences in various pathet.

See also

 Gangsa
 Gabbang

References 
 See, Yee-Seer. (2002). Gambang, Indonesian Gamelan Main Site. Center for Southeast Asian Studies, Northern Illinois University. http://www.seasite.niu.edu/Indonesian/Budaya_Bangsa/Gamelan/Javanese_Gamelan/counter-melody/gambang.htm, accessed 10 March 2006.
 Mantle Hood. The Nuclear Theme as a Determinant of Pathet in Javanese Music. New York: Da Capo, 1977. Page 240-242 is a discussion of the gambang gangsa.

External links

 NIU site, with audio excerpt

Panerusan instruments
Keyboard percussion instruments
Indonesian musical instruments
Philippine musical instruments